The jungin or chungin were the upper middle class of the Joseon Dynasty in medieval and early modern Korean society. The name "jungin" directly means "middle people". This privileged class of commoners consisted of a small group of petty bureaucrats and other highly educated skilled workers whose technical and administrative skills enabled the yangban and the royal family to rule the lower classes. Jungin were the lifeblood of the Korean Confucian agrarian bureaucracy, for whom the upper classes depended on to maintain their vice-like hold on the people. Their traditions and habits are the forerunners of the modern Korean administrative systems in both North and South Korea.

Professions and roles in the society 

In dynastic Korea, particularly during the Joseon period, the jungin were lower than the yangban aristocracy but above the lower middle and working class commoners in social status. They included highly educated government-employed specialists with a status comparable to modern white collar workers (e.g. interpreters, scientists, engineers, physicians, jurists, lawyers, astronomers, accountants, calligraphers, and musicians), military officers from or had marriage ties to the families producing technical specialists, hereditary government functionaries (both capital and local), and illegitimate children of aristocrats.

In everyday life, the jungin were below the aristocratic yangban but superior to the lower middle and working class sangmin. Their roles were minor technical and administrative officials who supported the structure of the government. The highest-ranking jungin, local functionaries, administratively enabled the yangban to oppress the lower classes, especially the total control they had over the sangmin. The jungin functioned as the middle-class and were essentially petty bureaucrats particularly in the rural areas.

Although inferior to the aristocracy in social standing, the highly educated jungin enjoyed far more privileges and influence than the lower middle and working class commoners. For example, the jungin were not taxed nor subject to military conscription. Like the yangban, they were allowed to live in the central part of the city, hence the name "middle people". Also, the jungin tended to marry within their own class as well as into the yangban class. In addition, since they were eligible to enter the palace as royal servants, it was possible for a jungin girl, if her father had a clean reputation or good connections and she was able to catch the King or Queen Dowager's eye, to become a royal consort or even a Royal Noble Consort, the second highest level in the hierarchy of the king's harem, after the Queen. An example is Royal Noble Consort Hui of the Indong Jang clan, personal name Jang Ok-jeong, was a consort of King Sukjong of Joseon and mother of Gyeongjong. She was the Queen of Joseon from 1689 until her deposition, in 1694.

However, to become a jungin, passing the chapkwa examination, which tested their practical knowledge of certain skills, was usually required. The jungin besides being known as a section of the middle-class, they were the smallest social class in dynastic Korea.

The Korean jungin, as a social class, were roughly analogous to the middle-class in Europe. Local functionaries in the rural areas were basically equal to petty bureaucrats.

Famous jungin 
Jungin were prominent especially in the late nineteenth and early twentieth centuries when they tended to welcome Western institutions and ideas for modernizing Korea. 
 Yu Dae-chi (a.k.a. Yu Hong-gi)
 Oh Gyeong-sok and his son, Oh Se-chang
 Byeon Su
 Kim Kyu-sik
 Choe Nam-seon

See also 
 Baekjeong
 Cheonmin
 Daeryeong Suksu
 Sangmin
 Yangban

References

External links 
 infoKorea

Korean caste system
Social classes
Society of the Joseon dynasty